Ednan Oskonovich Karabayev (born 17 January 1953 in Talas, Kyrgyz SSR) was the foreign minister of Kyrgyzstan from 1992 to 1993, and from February 2007 to January 2009.

References

1953 births
Living people
Government ministers of Kyrgyzstan
People from Talas, Kyrgyzstan
Foreign ministers of Kyrgyzstan
21st-century Kyrgyzstani politicians
20th-century Kyrgyzstani politicians